The following is a timeline of major events during the Iraqi insurgency (2011–2013):
Timeline of the Iraqi insurgency (2011)
Timeline of the Iraqi insurgency (2012)
Timeline of the Iraqi insurgency (2013)

References

Timelines of military conflicts since 1945
Timelines of military conflicts